The Bemidji Blue Ox Marathon is a race in Bemidji, Minnesota, first run in 2013. The race runs around a lake, along a state trail and through a state park. It takes place in October, when many of the forest surroundings are bright with color. 

The race has grown into a weekend of festivities that includes several races, nearly 1,000 runners, and the Be Active Expo at the Sanford Center.
The race director is Phil Knutson. The medical director is Dr. Mark Carlson. 

Live coverage of the race has been provided by local radio station KKBJ-FM, Mix 103.7. 

The race is certified by the USATF, thus it is a Boston Marathon qualifier.

Course
The race course is a loop, mostly flat with some hills and roughly 300 ft. total elevation gain. All of the route is on paved trails and roads. Runners cite the scenic nature of the course as a highlight of the race.

As of 2018, the course starts at the Sanford Center, the convention center and hockey arena, and then heads west before angling back toward the start for an eight-mile loop. The race continues on the shore of Lake Bemidji and follows the tree-lined Paul Bunyan State Trail over the Mississippi River before doubling back (for just a mile) after reaching Big Bass Lake. The route continues through the pines, poplar and spruce trees of Lake Bemidji State Park, back around the west side of panoramic Lake Bemidji, through the city's downtown, and past the Paul Bunyan and Babe the Blue Ox statues before returning to the Sanford Center. 

The course is a certified marathon distance (USATF #MN18060RR).

Race weekend
Several races take place as a part of the marathon weekend. The first day includes two kids races (a 1/2K and 1K), a 5K run and a 10K run. The marathon takes place on the second day along with a half marathon and a unique 26K (16.16-mile) race that circles Lake Bemidji. Throughout the weekend, the local arena hosts the Be Active Expo and (most years) the Bemidji State Beavers men's hockey team home games. 

The marathon and half marathon races offer pacers.

Prizes
Prizes for the marathon have included double-bit felling axes with engraved handles.

History
Local runner Dennis Bartz spearheaded the idea to bring a marathon to Bemidji, a city of nearly 15,000 people. Bartz coached cross country and track for Bemidji High School, and in the 1970s, was captain of his Bemidji State Beavers track and cross country teams. He wrote "Run For Your Life ... The Marathon, Minnesota Style" in 2011. In 2012, Bartz worked with a team of co-directors, including Cris Bitker, Jill Bitker, Aaron Riedel, Mark Peske, to plan and launch the first marathon weekend in 2013.

Michael Meehlhause, a Bemidji City Council member since 2012, has run in one of the races every year. His best times are 3:52:08 in the marathon (2013), 1:45:30 in the half marathon (2018), and 2:16:12 for 11th place in the 26K (2019).

2013
Marathon
The first Bemidji Blue Ox marathon took place Saturday, Oct. 12. The temperature was 54 degrees at the start and rose to 65 by noon while a strong wind carried in a light mist. Throughout the race, runners faced wet and chilly conditions. Still, the marathon race saw 184 runners finish from 23 U.S. states and two Canadian provinces, proving to race organizers that there was ample support for the event.

Gina Aalgaard Kelly led the women in the marathon and set a course record in 3:04:52. It has yet to be broken. It was another strong finish for the North Dakota State University alumnae and professor who was returning to her hometown. Earlier, in April, she took 2nd at the Run for the Lakes half marathon, and in June she had run sub-3:05 at Grandma's Marathon. 

The men's winner, Pete Miller, was also a Bemidji High School and North Dakota State alumnus. Local spectators recalled Miller running for the Bemidji Lumberjacks at the 1987–1988 Minnesota State cross country and track championships. Miller churned through the course and crossed the finish line first with a time of 2:46:19. The course record would stand until 2017. 

Half Marathon—The inaugural half marathon was run with the marathon; 388 runners competed to the finish line. Pam Olsen, who finished top-10 at the 2012 Fargo Marathon, won for women (1:32:27). Her time remained a course record for three years. 

Kenny Miller, a teacher at Bertha-Hewitt High School and former Bemidji State University alumnus, won the overall race in 1:14:04. A week before, he had run a 54:33 at the TC 10 Mile to finish 12th. Miller was often a top-10 contender at the Garry Bjorklund Half Marathon in the 2000s, and in 2003 had run 1:10:22 for eighth place.

5K—The first 5K was run Friday, Oct. 11. In field of 206 runners, winners were 16-year-old Evan Byler (20:14) and Amy Thorson (24:14).

2014

Marathon
The second Bemidji Blue Ox marathon took place Saturday, Oct. 11. The full and half-marathon courses were adjusted to cross the BNSF Railway tracks only once. The temperature was 38 degrees at the start of the race and rose to 55 degrees by mid-day with gusts of wind.

Tom Ritchie, an Alaska resident who had grown up in Bemidji, returned to the city to run. Ritchie is a physical education at South Anchorage High School and coaches the cross country team. In 2013, he had finished third in the Anchorage Mayor's Marathon in June, and then won the Humpy's Marathon (also in Anchorage) in August. At the Blue Ox marathon, Ritchie raced to the finish in 2:36:47 and beat out the 181 other runners, setting a course record that would stand for three years.

Sarah Kemp, a nurse in central Minnesota, won for the women (3:15:30) in her 12th marathon race. 

26K Lake Loop—The inaugural 26K (16.16-mile) Lake Loop race around Lake Bemidji was run on the same day as the marathon. The winners of the new 26K race were St. Olaf College alumnus Chris Bowman (1:51:31) and Canadian landscape architect Andrea Kennedy (2:07:44). The uncommon-distance race saw 220 runners finish.

Half marathon—The second half marathon saw Kenny Miller and Pam Olsen return to defend their titles. Miller won in 1:15:03 and Olsen in 1:33:43 in a field of 210 finishers.

5K—The second 5K was run Friday, Oct. 10. The winners lowered the course records. Elias Hendrickson, 20, (17:24) and Allison Beard, 13, (21:19) won in a field of 396 finishers. 

2015

Marathon

The third Bemidji Blue Ox Marathon took place Saturday, Oct. 10. The weather was 50 degrees at the 9 a.m. start and rose to 60 degrees by noon. A slight wind blew against the 133 runners as they ran on the west side of the lake. The courses of the races were changed due to construction.

Sarah Kemp returned to win her second victory with a time of 3:25:00. It was her fifth marathon in five months.

Bemidji State University alumnus Brock Tesdahl won the race in 2:52:30. Tesdahl was training while working as a physical education teacher and basketball coach at Hopkins High School. In college, Tesdahl played basketball for the Beavers. 

Ben Bruce finished second for the second year in a row.

26K Lake Loop—In the second 26K Lake Loop race, 166 runners competed to the finish. St. Louis Park High School staff member Brooks Grossinger won in 1:41:40, keeping an average 6:16-mile pace. As a high schooler,  Grossinger had finished in the top 20 at the 1994 Minnesota 1A cross country Championship. Grosslinger had won several triathlons and back in 2005 had finished 11th at the Garry Bjorkland Half Marathon, running a 1:11:30. 

Also on the starting line was the Minnesota State 2A Cross Country Champion from 2000: Lisa Dunning, who had run for Moorhead High School. Dunning had won the Fargo Marathon in 2012 and was  ready to race. She won for the woman in 1:58:38, a 7:07 minute-per-mile pace.

Half Marathon—In the third half marathon, 277 other runners faced returning champ Kenny Miller. He went on to win by more than 10 minutes over the second-place finisher. His time was 1:14:17. Returning woman's champ Pam Olsen ran the 26K (placing 5th), which allowed Kayla Gaulke to nab the half marathon title in 1:33:58.

5K—The 5K was run Friday, Oct. 9 and 365 runners finished. Erik Truedson, 24, crushed the competition, setting a course record with a 16:12 time. Alexis Paquette, 13, set the pace for women, winning in 22:40.

2016

Marathon
The fourth Bemidji Blue Ox Marathon took place Saturday, Oct. 8. The temperature was 35 degrees at the race start and rose to 44 degrees by noon. The sun was out in the afternoon.

The race course was changed again. Instead of running the starting four-mile loop into the country, the route was changed to run through downtown Bemidji.  

In the closest race yet, rookie runner James Staubel, who had never run more than 16 miles, dueled with Bryan Larison in the last mile. In 2015, Larison had finished second in the Minneapolis Marathon. He sprinted to pass Straubel, but couldn't catch him. Straubel crossed the line and fell to the ground, winning by six seconds in a time of 2:54:58. He was aided from the area in a wheelchair. His time remains the slowest win. 

Amy Will's win for the women (3:25:36) came on the heels of finishing third at the 2016 Grand Forks Marathon two weeks before.

26K Lake Loop—The third annual 26K scenic round-the-lake course continued to win praise. Spectators saw a repeat of last years duel between two top runners: Brooks Grossinger and Sam Dwyer. This year, Dwyer was the winner by just a few seconds, finishing in 1:43:40. He edged out the former winner as well as 135 other runners. 

For the women, Jessica Lovering notched down the course record to 1:55:09, a 6:55 minute-per-mile pace. Lovering had won the 2011 Minneapolis Marathon, taken second in the Twin Cities race in 2012, and in 2013, finished second at the Bemidji Blue Ox Marathon. 

Half Marathon—In the fourth half marathon, 286 runners lined up with Kenny Miller, the three-time champ. This time, Kyle Downs, winner of the 2016 Bismarck Half Marathon, set the pace. Downs won and set a new course record: 1:11:45. 

Bemidji runner Andrea Nelson was a familiar face to many. In 2014, she was 3rd in the marathon; in 2014, 2nd; in 2015 she placed 2nd in the 26K. This year, she not only won the half marathon, she set the course record in 1:31:49.

10K—The first 10K was run Friday, Oct. 7 in rainy, windy, cold weather. Only 89 people competed to the end, and local runner Kerrie Berg, 37, took the overall title in 45:54. For the men, Wayne Graves, 51, came in at 47:49.

5K—The fourth 5K saw 265 runners finish. Kathryn Fleischman, 25, of Roseau, Minnesota, set the course record and won the women's title, finishing in 20:32. In a foreshadow of wins to come, local runner Jesse Prince, 35, took the overall race in 17:57.

2017

Marathon

More 1,200 participated in the marathon weekend in 2017, the highest number to date.  

The fifth Bemidji Blue Ox Marathon took place Saturday, Oct. 14; 133 people finished the race. At the start of the race, it was 38 degrees and sunny, but an hour in, a light rain fell as the temperature rose to 50 degrees. 

At the starting line, last year's 5K winner Jesse Prince lined up with Bryan Larison, who finished 2nd in last year's marathon; Sam Dwyer, who had won last year's 26K Lake Loop; Erik Truedson, who set the 5K course record in 2015; and Brock Tesdahl, the 2015 marathon winner. 

Tesdahl ran away with the win to claim his second title in 2:37:31. 

Californian Annalise O'Toole, who had won the 2016 Bismarck Half Marathon, lead the woman's race and won in 3:19:04.

26K Lake Loop—The fourth annual 26K Lake Loop had 146 runners cross the finish line. The first was Brooks Grossinger, who took his second win in 1:42:48. The 2nd-place finisher was Charles Biberg, who won the 5K on Friday.

The first woman was North Dakotan Denise Kaelberer, who crossed in 1:58:04.

Half Marathon—In the fifth half marathon, 303 runners competed. 

Repeat winner Kenny Miller was back, but would be chasing others in the fastest half marathon to date. He and three other runners went on to break the course record. Leading them was Andrew Zachman, who blazed forward to win in 1:10:33. The new course record was also a new record for fastest Minnesota half marathon by a 20-year-old man. Zachman was a former prep standout. He had finished eighth in the 2013 Minnesota State 1A Cross Country championships while running for Holdingford High School. In 2016, he had finished second at the Lake Wobegon Trail Marathon as a 19 year old.

Andrea Nelson returned to repeat her woman's half marathon win and lower her course record by 10 seconds, finishing in 1:31:39.

10K—The second 10K was run Friday, Oct. 13; 84 runners finished. Philip Imholte, 37, won in 41:46, easily resetting the course record. Nicole Friend, 32, won for women in 46:15.

5K—The fifth 5K saw 281 runners finish. Charles Biberg, 25, won in 17:23, and Tara Makinen, 37, took the woman's crown in 22:25.

2018

Marathon
The sixth Bemidji Blue Ox marathon, held Oct. 13, had 123 competitors. At the start, the temperature was 38 degrees and rose to 41 as the overcast day went on. 
Brock Tesdahl ran a personal record time in the marathon to claim his third championship axe and break Tom Ritchie's 2014 course record. Tesdahl finished in 2:36:35.

Minnesota State University, Mankato alumnae Stacie Noha took the woman's axe, winning in 3:21:52.

26K Lake Loop—In the fifth 26K Lake Loop race, 147 runners finished. Michael Mettler won the overall race in 1:48:48. North Dakotan Mandy Elseth, who had finished 2nd in 2016, won the woman's race in 2:01:14.

Half Marathon—In the sixth half marathon, University of Wisconsin-Superior alumna Alyssa Breu broke through the woman's course record, winning in a time of 1:28:05. She had won the TC 10K just a week earlier. 

Kenny Miller returned to the half marathon and took back the winner's axe for his third overall win. He finished in 1:16:42.

10K—The shorter races were run on Friday, Oct. 12. The third 10K had 84 runners finish. Charles Biberg, 26, reset the course record to 36:52 in his win. Aislinn Hunter, 17, won for women in 43:14.

5K—The sixth 5K saw 281 runners finish. Jesse Prince, 36, returned to win his second winner's hatchet, coming in at 17:36. Heidi Bright, 45, took the woman's champion hatchet, finishing in 23:30.

2019
Marathon
The seventh Bemidji Blue Ox Marathon took place Saturday, Oct. 12. Snow was forecasted for the 2019 race, prompting officials to allow marathon runners to transfer into the shorter 26K lake loop. Only 112 runners would finish the marathon. 

At the starting line, runners braced against snow, wind, and the 32-degree weather that did not relent.

Local runner Jesse Prince entered the marathon for the third time, his best finish being second in 2017. He had also won the Blue Ox Run 5K in 2016 and 2018. Prince had another distinction in the city: in 1999, while a senior at Bemidji High School, he was the runner-up in the Minnesota AA 1600 meters championship, with a time of 4:17:33. 

As the marathon started, he cut through the conditions, clipping out sub-6 minute miles. He won the marathon with a time of 2:35:32, lowering the course record by a full minute. He finished with a 20-minute gap over second-place winner Ricky Aulie, who had sheered off nearly six minutes from his own 2016 third-place finish.  

In the woman's marathon race, the 2016 winner struck again. Amy Will won her second Blue Ox champion axe, coming in at 3:22:40. She had just won the Grand Forks Marathon in Grand Forks, North Dakota, two weeks before.  

26K Lake Loop—The sixth 26K Lake Loop saw North Branch's Casey Hovland set a woman's course record in 1:45:32. She finished second overall. She also became the youngest woman's first-place finisher in the race. The first-place winner was Matthew Arbegast (1:45:04), who beat the other 286 finishers.

Half Marathon—The seventh half marathon had 303 finishers. Brainerd's Landon Bruggeman won (1:23:34) in the slowest first-place finish on record, though Bruggeman finished more than a minute before second place Kenny Gudmundson. Danielle Bartz didn't seem hampered by the snow. She posted 1:32:32 in her win for the women's race.

10K—The shorter races took place Friday, Oct. 11. The fourth 10K was won by William Sackett (38:46) and Andrea Nelson (43:42) in a field of 67 finishers.

5K—The seventh 5K was won by Allex Vollen (18:11) and Tara Makinen (22:29) in a field of 303 finishers.

2020
The COVID-19 pandemic forced closures on nearly every marathon starting in mid-March, and while Grandma's Marathon and Twin Cities Marathon had cancelled two months in advance, smaller fall marathons in  appeared as though they would take place. Med City Marathon pushed back its start from May to September. The Ely Marathon, scheduled for September, and the Mankato Marathon, scheduled for October, still planned to go on. 

But one by one, each cancelled. By July 28, after Ely, Med City and Mankato marathons had fallen like dominos, race directors for Bemidji Blue Ox Marathon also cancelled their event, citing the state of Minnesota's policies regarding crowds. They announced that entry fees would not be refunded due to incurred costs. "The health and safety of our participants, volunteers, sponsors, spectators, and community remain our top priority," the race officials wrote in a press release.  

In Minnesota, the Bemidji Blue Ox Marathon was the last scheduled marathon of 2020 to announce cancellation, which the race officials did on July 28. All races were announced to have virtual versions, but all in-person races were cancelled.

Marathon results
Key:

All cities in Minnesota unless indicated otherwise

26K Lake Loop results
Key:

All cities in Minnesota unless indicated otherwise

Half marathon results
Key:

All cities in Minnesota unless indicated otherwise

* A "virtual" race was scheduled.

References

External links

Bemidji Blue Ox Marathon YouTube channel
Bemidji Blue Ox Marathon Flickr albums

Foot races in Minnesota
Marathons in Minnesota
Marathons in the United States
Recurring sporting events established in 2013
Bemidji, Minnesota